The 2009 European Athletics Indoor Championships was held in Turin, Italy, from Friday, 6 March to Sunday, 8 March 2009. The championships took place at the Oval Lingotto indoor arena which has a seating capacity of 6,700 people.

It was the fourth time that the championships were held in Italy.

Men's results

Track

Field

Combined

Women's results

Track

Field

Combined

Medal table

Participating nations

 (3)
 (2)
 (7)
 (1)
 (13)
 (6)
 (2)
 (7)
 (3)
 (5)
 (14)
 (13)
 (13)
 (13)
 (36)
 (1)
 (36)
 (1)
 (29)
 (7)
 (7)
 (16)
 (6)
 (34)
 (5)
 (10)
 (1)
 (1)
 (1)
 (1)
 (14)
 (6)
 (21)
 (12)
 (17)
 (57)
 (2)
 (5)
 (11)
 (6)
 (36)
 (13)
 (4)
 (12)
 (20)

References

External links

Official Website

 
2009
European Indoor Championships in Athletics
European Indoor Championships in Athletics
International athletics competitions hosted by Italy
Sports competitions in Turin
March 2009 sports events in Europe
2000s in Turin